Two warships of Sweden have been named Sjöbjörnen, after Sjöbjörnen:

 , a  launched in 1938 and stricken in 1964.
 , a  launched in 1968 and sold to Singapore in 1997.

Swedish Navy ship names